Statistics of Swedish football Division 5 for the 2011 season. This is Part 1 which covers Blekinge, Bohuslän, Dalarna, Dalsland, Gestrikland, Gotland, Göteborg, Halland, Hälsingland, Jämtland-Härjedalen, Medelpad, Norrbotten, Skåne and Småland.

See also 2011 Division 5 (Part 2) which covers Stockholm, Södermanland, Uppland, Värmland, Västerbotten, Västergötland, Västmanland, Ångermanland, Örebro Läns and Östergötland.

League standings

Blekinge 2011

Bohuslän 2011

Dalarna Norra 2011

Dalarna Södra 2011

Dalsland 2011

Gotland 2011

Gästrikland 2011

Norrham                         Withdrew

Göteborg A 2011

Göteborg B 2011

Halland Norra 2011

Halland Södra 2011

Hälsingland 2011

Trönö IK 2                      Withdrew

Jämtland/Härjedalen 2011

Medelpad 2011

Norrbotten Norra 2011

Pajala IF                       Withdrew

Norrbotten Södra 2011

Skåne Nordvästra 2011

Skåne Nordöstra 2011

Skåne Sydvästra 2011

Skåne Sydöstra 2011

Skåne Södra 2011

Skåne Västra 2011

Småland Nordvästra 2011

Småland Nordöstra 2011

Småland Norra 2011

Småland Sydöstra 2011

Småland Södra 2011

Småland Västra 2011

See also
 2011 Swedish football Division 5 (Part 2)

Footnotes

References 

Swedish Football Division 5 seasons
7